Hamra is a neighborhood (sector 34) in Beirut (quarter Ras Beirut), Lebanon. The center of the neighborhood, Hamra Street, is one of Beirut's major commercial districts, and is known for its fashion stores, as well as many restaurants, cafes, bars and hotels.  The area is known for having a lively nightlife.

Notably, The American University of Beirut and Lebanese American University are both located in the neighborhood.

Hamra Street used to be one of the main places where Arab poets, writers, thinkers, and philosophers used to meet and collaborate, making it an important cultural hub of Beirut.  Many ruins of the Lebanese Civil War remain obvious on the walls of buildings to this day, but it has also seen much urban development over the last decades.  Although it may not be as vibrant culturally and artistically as it once was, it is still a street rich with life and art. Graffiti has become a form of artistic expression found on the walls of the buildings along the central boulevard; an example of this is a mural of the popular singer and icon Sabah found towards the beginning of the street.

References

Neighbourhoods of Beirut